La Pola de Gordón is a municipality located in the province of León, Castile and León, Spain. According to the 2004 census (INE), the municipality has a population of 4,422 inhabitants.

References

Municipalities in the Province of León